Pravin Mani is an Indian musician who has been credited as singer and as composer in Tamil, Malayalam, Telugu and English films in India. He has been a long term associate with noted music director, A. R. Rahman, with recent collaborations in Enthiran. He has also played a key role in the background scores for several Rahman films including Mudhalvan and Alaipayuthey. He resides in Toronto, Canada.

Notable discography

Film scores and soundtracks 

#Only background music, film songs composed by another composer

 The films are listed in order of the album release date, irrespective of the film release.
 The year next to the title of the affected films indicates the release year of the either dubbed or remade version in the named language later than the original version.
 indicates original language release. Indicates simultaneous makes, if featuring in more languages
 indicates a remade version, the remaining ones being dubbed versions

References

Tamil playback singers
Living people
Tamil musicians
Tamil film score composers
Indian male playback singers
Indian male composers
Musicians from Chennai
Male film score composers
Year of birth missing (living people)